The archaeological gallery roads were roads through remote mountain areas of China. They consisted of wooden planks erected on holes cut into the sides of cliffs. They were most notably used in the Qin Mountains linking the Wei River and the Han River valleys. The first gallery roads were built during the Warring States period (476-221 BC) and used by Qin to invade Shu and Ba. They were fully consolidated into a thriving network during the Han Dynasty. Before the 20th century, very primitive versions were used in the western gorges of the Pamir Mountains.

Introduction 

Gallery road, also known as cliff road, plank road, is a creative building in Chinese history. The main use of the gallery road is to establish a traffic route over a cliff in a steep mountainous area. The Shu Road is the most typical representative. It passes through some of the most rugged and desolate terrains in China, such as the Qinling Mountains and the Daba Mountain ranges, linking the Wei river valley with the ancient capital of Chang'an. Using the plank road technology to fasten the road to the cliff and cross the steep ravine.

The structure of the gallery road is usually built according to the structure of the mountain, so each section of the gallery road is different. Generally, the most common gallery road is the wooden plank road, which is dug holes on the cliff, tamped with thick wooden piles, and covered with wooden boards. The stone road is to cut the stone and carve the cliff stone into a gallery road. 

The modern gallery road is reconstructed based on the original ancient damaged or dangerous plank road using steel, stone, etc. In order to make the plank road more beautiful and exciting, some use glass to build the gallery road, so that tourists can enjoy more scenery.

Historical evidence of Gallery Road

Shudao 
Shu dao is the general name of the historical road that was constructed through the Qinling, Micang and Daba mountainous barrier. The main function of the Shu dao is to connect the Wei river valley (Today's Guan zhong) with the ancient capital Chang’An (Today's Xi’An) in the north with Shu (Today's Chengdu) in the south. Shu Road passes through the most rugged and desolate terrains in China.  The first of the major highways was most likely built in the Warring States (481-221 BCE) period. During the Qin (221-206 BCE) and Han (206 BCE to 220 CE) dynasties, they started massive and advanced road building. For the most part, they took advantage of natural corridors discovered and used by ancient peoples earlier. In order to build these important paths along the steep and dangerous cliff, the ancients used the innovative road building technique “Gallery Road” to fix the roads on the rock walls and cross the mountains, rivers and valleys.

See also
 Stone Cattle Road
 Covered bridge

 Archaeology in China
 Shudao

References 

Ancient roads and tracks
Transport in China
Plank road